The 2018–19 season was FC Barcelona Femení's 18th season as FC Barcelona's official women's football section and its 11th consecutive season in Primera División.

Season overview
On June 4, 2018, the club announced their first transfer- the arrival of Dutch defender and 2017 UEFA Women's EURO winner Stefanie van der Gragt from AFC Ajax.

On June 6, 2018, the club announced the retirement of Spanish goalkeeper Andrea Giménez after two years with the club.

On June 12, 2018, the club announced that Spanish defender Ruth García would return to her previous club Levante UD Femenino, where she played for nine years. García was at Barcelona for five years.

On June 19, 2018, the club announced the signing of French midfielder Kheira Hamraoui from French club Lyon.

On June 25, 2018, the club announced the signing of Mexican goalkeeper Pamela Tajonar from Sevilla, where she spent 4 seasons.

On June 30, 2018, six player contracts expired. Of those were Danish defender Line Røddik Hansen, who transferred to Danish side FC Nordsjælland, Spanish goalkeeper and club captain Laura Ràfols who retired after 14 years with the club, and young defender Perle Morroni, who returned to Paris-Saint Germain after the expiration of a six-month loan deal.

On July 2, 2018, the club announced the departure of Spanish forward Olga García to Atlético Madrid after 3 years with the club.

On July 24, 2018, Marta Unzué was sent to Athletic Club on a two-year loan deal.

On August 25, 2018, Barcelona won their seventh and fifth-consecutive Copa Catalunya by defeating Espanyol 7-0.

On January 8, 2019, following a draw to league rivals Espanyol, the club announced the termination of coach Fran Sanchez's contract. Former Catalan national team coach Lluís Cortés assumed his role the same day.

On December 31, 2018, Élise Bussaglia left the club and transferred to French side Dijon.

On January 31, 2019, at the end of the January transfer window, the club signed striker Asisat Oshoala on a 6-month loan deal from Chinese club Dalian Quanjian. Oshoala was given Bussaglia's vacated number 20.

On February 17, 2019, Barcelona exited the Copa de la Reina following a 2-0 loss to eventual champions Atlético Madrid.

On March 27, 2019, Barcelona defeated LSK Kvinner in the UWCL and reached their second ever UWCL semifinal, where they would play FC Bayern Munich.

With goals by Kheira Hamraoui in the first leg and a Mariona Caldentey penalty in the second leg, Barcelona ended their semifinal tie on April 28 with a 2-0 aggregate score and reached their first ever UWCL final.

The league race went down to the final day, but Barcelona fell to Granadilla on the final match day. With an Atleti win, the league ended with Atleti receiving 86 points and Barcelona receiving 78, making it the 4th season in a row that Barcelona finished second in the league.

On May 18, 2019, Barcelona played their first UWCL final against European powerhouse Lyon. The match ended in a 4-1 loss for Barcelona, the single Barcelona goal in the match coming from Asisat Oshoala.

Despite having relative success in all competitions, this was the first year since 2010 where Barcelona went trophyless (not including the Copa Catalunya).

Results

League

League table

League Matches

UEFA Women's Champions League

Round of 32

Barcelona won 4–3 on aggregate.

Round of 16

Barcelona won 8–0 on aggregate.

Quarterfinals

Barcelona won 4–0 on aggregate.

Semifinals

Barcelona won 2–0 on aggregate.

Final

Copa de la Reina

Round of 16

Quarterfinals

Semifinals

Squad

Squad appearances and goals
As of 15 May 2019

Transfers

Transfers in

Transfers out

References

FC Barcelona Femení seasons
2018–19 in Spanish women's football
Barcelona Femení